Depressaria besma is a moth in the family Depressariidae. It was described by Clarke in 1947. It is found in North America, where it has been recorded from Washington and California.

The larvae feed on Lomatium utriculatum.

References

Moths described in 1947
Depressaria
Moths of North America